The Women's Irish Senior Cup is the premier knockout trophy played for by the top women's field hockey clubs in Ireland. The competition is held under the auspices of the Irish Hockey Association, a body that was formed with the merger of the men's and women's Unions in 2000. The Irish Ladies Hockey Union was the first women's hockey organisation in the world.

Historical format

From its start in 1903, the tournament was played through regional tournaments. The winners of the regional tournaments in Leinster, Munster and Ulster would proceed through to an open draw. Occasionally representatives from the South East Branch and the Connacht Branch also took part. In 1990, it was decided to change the format to an open draw with the top four sides from each of the provinces competing.

Current format

In 1995 the decision was made to open the competition to all Senior Clubs in Ireland with seeding for the elite clubs introduced in 2000, exempting them from playing in the first two rounds, and going a long way to avoid mismatches.

The Final is played in Dublin and is normally broadcast by the Irish national television broadcaster RTÉ.

Finals
(Records are incomplete)

1900s

1910s

1920s

1930s

1940s

1950s

1960s

1970s

1980s

1990s

2000s

2010s

Notes:

 a Alexandra College/Old College would later be named Old Alexandra

2020s

Sources

External links
 The Irish Hockey Association Website

       
Senior Cup
1903 establishments in Ireland